Pacific Linguistics was established in 1963 as a non-profit publisher at the Australian National University, Canberra, publishing linguistic books (such as grammars and dictionaries) on the languages of Oceania, the Pacific, Australia, Indonesia, Malaysia, the Philippines,  Southeast Asia, South Asia, and East Asia.

Since 2012, Pacific Linguistics has been published by Walter de Gruyter.

Managing editors
Stephen Wurm was the founding editor.

Tom Dutton was the managing editor of Pacific Linguistics from 1987 to 1996. Other former managing editors are Malcolm Ross, Darrell Tryon, John Bowden, and Paul Sidwel.

The current managing editor is Alexander Adelaar.

See also
ANU Press

References

External links
Pacific Linguistics at De Gruyter Mouton
Australian National University Press
Pacific Linguistics Publications Archive (up to volume 570)

Publishing companies of Australia
Australian National University
Non-profit publishers